Indirect elections were held for the presidency and vice-presidency of the government of the Republic of China on Taiwan on March 21, 1978. The vote took place at the Chung-Shan Building in Yangmingshan, Taipei.  Premier Chiang Ching-kuo, son of former President Chiang Kai-shek, was elected as the President with Governor of Taiwan Province Hsieh Tung-min who became the first Taiwan-born Vice President.

Incumbent President Yen Chia-kan who succeeded Chiang Kai-shek who died in office in the capacity of Vice President in 1975 decided not to seek for re-election to make way for Chiang King-kuo, son of Chiang Kai-shek and the then premier and chairman of the Kuomintang.

Electors

The election was conducted by the National Assembly in its meeting place Chung-Shan Building in Yangmingshan, Taipei. According to the Temporary Provisions against the Communist Rebellion, National Assembly delegates elected in the following elections were eligible to vote:
 1947 Chinese National Assembly election,
 1969 Taiwanese legislative election, and
 1972 Taiwanese legislative election.
In total, there were 1,220 delegates reported to the secretariat to attend this sixth session of the first National Assembly.

Results

President

Vice president

See also
History of Republic of China
President of the Republic of China
Vice President of the Republic of China

References

Presidential elections in Taiwan
1978 in Taiwan
Taiwan